A card deck is a stack of cards, sometimes an ordered stack.

These cards may be either:
 Card deck (gaming), playing cards in gaming
 Card deck (computing), punched cards in computing